The Home Towners is a 1928 American comedy film directed by Bryan Foy and starring Richard Bennett, Doris Kenyon, and Robert McWade. This film was the third all talking picture produced by Warner Brothers to be released.

Cast
 Richard Bennett as Vic Arnold  
 Doris Kenyon as Beth Calhoun  
 Robert McWade as P. H. Bancroft  
 Robert Edeson as Mr. Calhoun  
 Gladys Brockwell as Lottie Bancroft  
 John Miljan as Joe Roberts  
 Vera Lewis as Mrs. Calhoun
 Stanley Taylor as Wally Calhoun
 James T. Mack as Casey
 Patricia Caron as Maid

Preservation status
The Home Towners is now lost.

References

Bibliography
 Roy Liebman. Vitaphone Films: A Catalogue of the Features and Shorts. McFarland, 2003.

External links

1928 films
1928 comedy films
Silent American comedy films
Films directed by Bryan Foy
1920s English-language films
American black-and-white films
Warner Bros. films
Lost American films
1928 lost films
Lost comedy films
1920s American films